Uyirodu Uyiraga is a 1998 Indian Tamil-language romantic drama film directed by Sushma Ahuja starring Ajith Kumar and Richa Ahuja in the main roles. The film which told the tale of a couple's struggle to deal with terminal illness, had a successful music soundtrack composed by Vidyasagar. The film was released on 21 November 1998.

Plot
The film details on how the parents of a young teen aged boy diagnosed with chronic brain tumor accept and deal with his sickness, Anjali (Richa Ahuja)'s undeterred love for the optimistic Ajay who is on the verge of death is beautifully depicted throughout the film.

Cast
 Ajith Kumar as Ajay
 Richa Ahuja as Anjali
 Sarath Babu as Chandrasekhar, Ajay's father
 Srividya as Raji, Ajay's mother
 Ambika as Anjali's mother
 Mohan Sharma as Anjali's father
 Sathyapriya as Nurse
 Devipriya as Priya, Anjali's friend
 Lavanya as Anjali's friend

Production
The director, Sushma Ahuja, originally wanted to make in Hindi but eventually filmed in Tamil with Ajith Kumar and Richa Ahuja, her daughter. Richa took up the offer, after another popular actress had opted out of the role due to date issues. Singeetam Srinivasa Rao, with whom Sushma worked in the silent movie Pushpak, encouraged her to take up this project. The film was reportedly based on a real event which had occurred in the early 1990s. The songs composed by Vidyasagar won positive reviews. The film was initially scheduled to release on 19 October 1998 to coincide with Diwali, but was delayed by a month.

Release
The film released to positive reviews from film critics. A reviewer praised the film as "a clean movie with no masala stuff" but criticized the "weak story-line", while also praising the performances in the film. Another critic drew particular praise to the role of Srividya, claiming the film was "a pleasant experience, the crowds cheered Srividya almost as much as Ajith". The film failed commercially, with Sushma Ahuja blaming the result on poor promotion.

Soundtrack

The songs composed by Vidyasagar, won positive acclaim from reviewers.

References

External links 
 

Indian drama films
1998 films
1990s Tamil-language films
Films scored by Vidyasagar
1998 drama films